Wana — formerly Wise — is an unincorporated community in northwestern Monongalia County, West Virginia, United States.  It lies along West Virginia Route 7 northwest of the city of Morgantown, the county seat of Monongalia County.  Its elevation is 1,030 feet (314 m).  It has a post office with the ZIP code 26590.

References

Unincorporated communities in Monongalia County, West Virginia
Unincorporated communities in West Virginia